Tangle is the second album by Thinking Fellers Union Local 282, released as an LP in 1989 through the band's own label, Thwart Productions.

Track listing

Personnel 
Thinking Fellers Union Local 282
Paul Bergmann – drums, accordion, vocals
Mark Davies – guitar, bass guitar, vocals
Anne Eickelberg – bass guitar
Brian Hageman – guitar, tape, vocals
Hugh Swarts – guitar, vocals
Production and additional personnel
Kevin Barnard – design
Gib Curry – photography
Greg Freeman – production, engineering
Thinking Fellers Union Local 282 – production

References

External links 
 

1989 albums
Thinking Fellers Union Local 282 albums